Timčo Mucunski (Macedonian: Тимчо Муцунски) (born ) is the mayor of the Aerodrom Municipality and a university professor, who currently serves as vice-president of the political party VMRO-DPMNE. He served as Deputy Minister of Information Society and Public Administration in the Government of the Republic of Macedonia between 2015 and 2017, and as a Member of Parliament between 2020 and 2021.

Biography 
Timčo Mucunski was born on 29 July 1989 in Berovo, SR Macedonia, SFR Yugoslavia, now in North Macedonia. He attended Lisgar Collegiate Institute in Ottawa, Canada for high school, and graduated there in June 2006.

In June 2009 he received his Bachelor of Laws (LL.B.) from the Faculty of Law “Iustinianus Primus”, Ss. Cyril and Methodius University of Skopje. After receiving his bachelor's degree, he enrolled in the LL.M. Program in administrative law and public administration at the Faculty of Law “Iustinianus Primus”, University of Ss. Cyril and Methodius where he successfully defended his master's thesis on 4 July 2011. In 2019 he defended his PhD at the Faculty of Law “Iustinianus Primus”, Ss. Cyril and Methodius University of Skopje.

From 2009 to 2015 he was as a junior teaching associate at the Faculty of Law “Iustinianus Primus”, Ss. Cyril and Methodius University in Skopje, and from 2015 to 2019 he was as a research and teaching assistant at the same institution. As of 2019 he is an assistant professor of law at the same institution.

He has co-authored two university textbooks, published by the Faculty of Law “Iustinianus Primus”, Ss. Cyril and Methodius University in Skopje: Corporate Governance (published in 2014), and Gambling Law (published in 2013), as well as over 20 scientific and expert papers in the field of legal sciences, many of which have been published in well-known academic journals.

Between 11 November 2015 and 22 June 2017, Timco Mucunski served as Deputy Minister of Information Society and Public Administration in the Cabinets of Nikola Gruevski and Emil Dimitriev.

As of 2018 he is the international secretary of the political party VMRO-DPMNE.

At the 2020 North Macedonian parliamentary election, he was elected to the Assembly of North Macedonia, representing Electoral Unit 1 which encompasses most of the city of Skopje. While serving in the Assembly, he chaired the Parliamentary Committee on Finance and Budget.

References

1989 births
Government ministers of North Macedonia
Information ministers
Living people
People from Berovo
Academic staff of the Ss. Cyril and Methodius University of Skopje
Ss. Cyril and Methodius University of Skopje alumni
Lisgar Collegiate Institute alumni
Members of the Assembly of North Macedonia
Mayors of places in North Macedonia
Aerodrom Municipality, Skopje